The Kiev Missal (or Kiev Fragments or Kiev Folios; scholarly abbreviation Ki) is a seven-folio Glagolitic Old Church Slavonic canon manuscript containing parts of the Roman-rite liturgy. It is usually held to be the oldest and the most archaic Old Church Slavonic manuscript, and is dated at no later than the latter half of the 10th century. Seven parchment folios have been preserved in small format (14.5 cm × 10.5 cm) of easily portable book to be of use to missionaries on the move.

Discovery and publishing 
Kiev Folios were found in the 19th century in Jerusalem by the Archimandrite Andrej Kapustin (Antonin Kapustin), who donated them to the Kiev Theological Academy. After the 1917 Russian Revolution, the folios were transferred to the library of the Ukrainian Academy of Sciences in Kiev where they are being kept today.

Izmail Sreznevsky made the manuscript known to the public, editing the first edition of Kiev Folios in 1874. They have been republished many times since, though not always successfully. Notable editions are by Vatroslav Jagić in 1890 (Glagolitica. 2. Würdigung neuentdeckter Fragmente, Mit 10 Taf., Wien 1890, Denkschrift. Kaiserl. Akad., Bd. 38), by Sievers in 1924 (Die altslavischen Verstexte von Kiew und Freising, Leipzig 1924, Akad. Wiss., phil.-hist. Kl., Bd. 76/2) and by Mohlberg in 1928 (Il messale di Kiew/sec IX./ed il suo prototipo Romano del VI-VII). 

Special attention to the Kiev folios has been paid by Václav Vondrák in a paper O původu Kijevských listů a Pražských zlomků a o bohemismech v starších církevněslovanských památkách vůbec (Praha, 1904). The newest facsimile edition has been published in 1983 in Kiev to honor the ninth International Congress of Slavists which was held there (V. V. Nimčuk, Kijivs′ki hlaholični lystky, AN USSR). That edition contains extensive overview of the existing bibliography of the Kiev Folios.

Dating and origin 
The first page of the first folio was written later than other pages, probably at the boundary of the 11th and 12th centuries. Linguistic, paleographic and graphic features indicate South Croatia as its place of origin. This page contains parts of Paul's epistles (13, 11-14 and 14, 1-4). That part of the Kiev Folios and the problems associated with it has been thoroughly analyzed by the Croatian Slavist Marija Pantelić, who finally situated it somewhere in the Dubrovnik area.

The rest of the folios, containing part of the Roman Missal, is dated at no later than the second half of the 10th century.

Content 
By content it is a Roman Missal, i.e., a book collecting all the text used at the holy mass service. Missal texts are accompanied by instructions on how to perform rites throughout the liturgical year, called rubrics, which is a term originating from Latin word rubrica designating red soil used for painting. 

The text of the Kiev Missal folios has been for the most part written in black (the text meant to be pronounced), and for the lesser part in red (the instructions for gestures that the priest must perform and other instructions for the ceremony). Since the Kiev Missal has only 13 pages preserved, it's obvious that only a part of the missal has been preserved, from the sacramentary containing crucial and unchangeable parts spoken by the priest.

Linguistic features 
The Kiev Folios are generally held by Slavists as the oldest among the OCS canon manuscripts, even though they exhibit several West Slavic features that place them at the beginning of the Czech-Moravian recension of OCS. These are:
 Instead of OCS št, žd we find West Slavic reflexes of Proto-Slavic */tj/ (also from earlier *kt) and */dj/, i.e. instead of pomoštь, prosęšte, priemljǫšte, daždь, tuždimъ, tъžde we find pomocь, prosęce, priemljǫce, dazь, tuzimъ, tъze etc.
 At the place of Proto-Slavic *stj and *skj we would expect a reflex of OCS št, but we find šč: očiščeniě, zaščiti (imperative), zaščititь.
 As an ending of instrumental singular of masculine o-stems we would expect -omь. But instead, -ъmь is used, so instead of expected oplatomь, obrazomь, vъsǫdomь we find oplatъmь, obrazъmь, vъsǫdъmь.
 Genitive of first-person pronoun azъ is mene in OCS. In Kiev Folios we find mne by the elision of weak yer.

As features that connect Kiev Folios to the canonic manuscripts of other important Slavic area, namely Bulgarian, one has to note:
 consistent distinguishing between yers ъ and ь, and only twice ъ is found where ь is expected
 Kiev folios preserve nasal vowels (/ę/ and /ǫ/) and don't mix them

Controversies 
Croatian Slavist Josip Hamm stirred a fierce debate in his book Das Glagolitische Missale von Kiew (Wien, 1979). In it, and in his other papers and lectures he maintained the view that the Kiev Folios are a 19th-century fake by Czech patriots in order to prove the antiquity of Czech literary culture. However, in general Slavists do not hold this view.

See also

 List of Glagolitic manuscripts

Notes

References

External links
 Kiev Folios, at TITUS project
 Kiev Folios, at MANUSCRIPT project

10th-century biblical manuscripts
Old Church Slavonic canon
South Slavic manuscripts
Cyrillo-Methodian studies